Keith J. Osborne (born April 2, 1969) is a Canadian former professional ice hockey right winger. He was drafted in the first round, 12th overall, by the St. Louis Blues in the 1987 NHL Entry Draft. He played just five games with the Blues, during the 1989–90 season. He also played eleven games with the Tampa Bay Lightning in the 1992–93 season.

In his sixteen-game National Hockey League career, Osborne scored one goal and added three assists.

Keith is currently the head coach of the Welland Jr. Canadians Jr B hockey team that plays in the Greater Ontario Junior Hockey League. He will be behind their bench for an 8th season when it starts in September 2018. He was previously behind the bench for the Port Colborne Pirates (now Pelham Panthers) of the same league before leaving them to join Welland.

Career statistics

External links

1969 births
Living people
Atlanta Knights players
Augsburger Panther players
Canadian ice hockey right wingers
Ice hockey people from Toronto
Macon Whoopee (CHL) players
National Hockey League first-round draft picks
Newmarket Saints players
Niagara Falls Thunder players
North Bay Centennials players
Peoria Rivermen (IHL) players
Saginaw Gears (UHL) players
St. John's Maple Leafs players
St. Louis Blues draft picks
St. Louis Blues players
San Antonio Dragons players
Tampa Bay Lightning players
Utah Grizzlies (IHL) players
Winston-Salem IceHawks players
Canadian expatriate ice hockey players in Germany
Canadian expatriate ice hockey players in the United States